Abres is one of six parishes in Vegadeo, a municipality within the province and autonomous community of Asturias, in northern Spain. 

Villages
 As Aceñas
 A Cruxa
 Abraira
 A Antigua
 O Molín
 Grandamiá
 O Pebidal
 A Ponte
 A Rúa

External links
 Abres in the historical Dictionary Madoz (Spanish)

Parishes in Vegadeo